Paltan Bazaar is a locality of Guwahati, Assam. It is surrounded by the localities of Pan Bazaar, Uloobari, Rehabari, Fancy Bazaar. Its location in the central part of the city-centre is the hub for transportation and hotels in Guwahati, Assam. With Guwahati Railway Station, the ASTC bus stand, numerous hotels, restaurants, offices and stops of numerous private bus service (regional) providers, makes it one of the busiest and congested area of city. There are also many small shops selling traditional garments from various parts of the North-East.

See also

References

Bazaars
Bazaars in India
Neighbourhoods in Guwahati